Magna is an American bicycle brand owned by Dynacraft BSC. Magna bikes are produced in China and are sold in American retail stores such as Target and Wal-Mart.

Bicycles
Magna offers bicycles in many different colors and sizes from child to adult. The bikes are sold as affordable alternatives to higher end bikes.

Models

12"
 Lil Dreamer-3–5 years old 
 Gravel Blaster—3–5 years old 
 Wheelie-3-5 years old
 Bare Bones-3-5 years old
16"
 Stardom-4-8 years old 
 Misfit-4-8 years old
 Starburst-4-8 years old
 Major Damage-4-8 years old
 Rattlesnake-4-8 years old
 Maui Miss-4-8 years old
18"
 Rip Tide-6-9 years old
 Inspire-6-9 years old
20"
 Throttle-6-10 years old
 Sapphire-6-10 years old
 Great Divide-6-10 years old
 Cliff Runner-6-10 years old
 Precious Pearls-6-10 years old
 Threat-6-10 years old
 Torrid-6-10 years old
 Rip Claw-6-10 years old
 Oasis-6-10 years old
 Busted-6-10 years old
24"
 Great Divide—Young Adults
 Outreach-Young Adults
 Northern Ridge-Young Adults
 Rip Curl-Young Adults

26"
RX Pro- Young Adults and Adults
 Beaver Cruiser- Young Adults and Adults 
 Wash Cruiser-Young Adults and Adults 
 Cliff Runner-Young Adults and Adults 
 Rip Curl-Young Adults and Adults 
 Nantucket-Young Adults and Adults 
 Waikiki-Young Adults and Adults 
 Northern Ridge-Young Adults and Adults 
 Washst-Young Adults and Adults 
 Duck Cruiser-Young Adults and Adults 
 Great Divide-Young Adults and Adults 
 Boisests-Young Adults and Adults 
 Outreach-Young Adults and Adults 
 Oasis-Young Adults and Adults 
28"
 700C-Young Adults and Adults

Issues
In 1999, Dynacraft voluntarily recalled about 3,000 Magna "Great Divide" 21 speed mountain bikes, sold in the 24-inch size for girls and boys, and the 26-inch size for women and men. The bikes could have defective handle bar stems which would not tighten sufficiently to lock onto the bicycles. This can cause the front wheel not to turn properly, resulting in serious injuries to the rider from falls. Dynacraft stated that is not aware of any injuries or incidents involving these bicycles. The bikes have a model number on the left side of the seat post. The girls' bikes have model number 8504-50 and are purple. The boys' bikes have model number 8504-51 and are blue. The women's bikes have model number 8547-84 and also are purple. The men's bikes have model number 8547-85 and are black. The words "Great Divide" are located on the cross-tubes of these bicycles and the word "KALLOY" is located on the handlebar stems. Fred Meyer Stores in Alaska, Arizona, Idaho, Oregon, Utah and Washington sold these bikes from December 1998 through August 18, 1999.

References
http://www.cpsc.gov/en/Recalls/2000/CPSC-Dynacraft-Industries-Announce-Recall-of-Mountain-Bikes-Sold-at-Target-Stores/

External links
 Official website

Road cycles
Cycle manufacturers of the United States